Tiyanak is a 1988 Filipino horror film directed by Peque Gallaga and Lorenzo A. Reyes and co-written by Gallaga, Reyes, and Don Escudero, based on the mythical creature of the same name. It stars Janice de Belen, Lotlot de Leon, Ramon Christopher, Mary Walter, Chuckie Dreyfus, Carmina Villaroel, Rudolph Yaptinchay, and Smokey Manaloto.

Tiyanak was released by Regal Films on September 15, 1988. Though other critics were disappointed with the film, Tiyanak received praise from Lav Diaz for being remarkably frightening. Eduardo Jacinto won the Film Academy of the Philippines Award for Best Cinematography.

Cast
Janice de Belen as Julie
Lotlot de Leon as Christie
Ramon Christopher as Jojo
Mary Walter
Chuckie Dreyfus as Aries
Carmina Villaroel as Monica
Rudolph Yaptinchay as Mars
Smokey Manaloto
Bella Flores
Betty Mae Piccio
Eva Ramos
Suzanne Gonzales
Mae Ann Adonis
Bonafe
Zorayda Sanchez as Telyang Bayawak

Critical response
The film received negative reviews from critics. Mario Hernando, film critic for the television program Movie Magazine, gave the film two stars out of five. Meg Mendoza of the Manila Standard was more negative, writing that the film had predictable and manipulative horror scenes, as well as tedious pacing, though she commended the special effects and the performances of Villaroel and Manaloto. Overall, Mendoza expressed disappointment, stating that "we could hardly believe it was directed by award-winning director Peque Gallaga, who gave us the magnum opus Oro, Plata, Mata.

However, Lav Diaz, who also wrote for the Manila Standard, gave high praises to the film, stating that "films like Tiyanak, even when it is horror, are the ones that will save or contribute quality to the development of Filipino cinema.... One thing that elevates this film is its success in achieving its ambition – to scare. [It is] really scary."

In 2000, historian Ambeth Ocampo stated that "[Tiyanak] is a horror film so camp and funny it is downright memorable."

Accolades

References

External links

1988 films
1988 horror films
Filipino-language films
Films directed by Peque Gallaga
Films shot in Laguna (province)
Philippine horror films
Regal Entertainment films
Films directed by Lore Reyes